The Jurors is an artwork by Hew Locke, installed at Runnymede in Surrey in 2015 to commemorate the 800th anniversary of the sealing of Magna Carta.

Commissioned in 2014 by Surrey County Council and the National Trust, it comprises 12 high-backed bronze chairs placed in a grassy meadow, arranged in a rectangular formation to face inwards as if around a table, with one chair at each end and five along each side.

The surfaces of each chair are decorated with images and symbols representing freedom, the rule of law, and human rights, clockwise from one end: 

The decorations cast into the chairs also include garlands of flowers, as a reference to the Victorian language of flowers, including coltsfoot, black-eyed Susan and horse chestnut for aspects of justice, and hops for injustice; images of ermine as a reference to the traditional robes of English judges; and keys to prison cells, including a key to the Bastille which was given to George Washington by the Marquis de Lafayette in 1790.

Locke deliberately avoided representing a "collection of heroes", and intended his 24 selected scenes to provoke reflection and debate.  Locke considers that the artwork is only completed when each chair is occupied by people discussing the issues depicted. 

It was dedicated on 15 June 2015, at a ceremony attended by Prince William, Duke of Cambridge.  The ceremony included a dramatised performance of the poem "Or In Any Other Way" by Owen Sheers, in which twelve actors emerged from the crowds to recite a stanza each, and then took a place on one of the chairs.

References

 The Jurors by Hew Locke, at Runnymede and Ankerwycke, National Trust
 What does The Jurors represent?, National Trust
 The dedication of The Jurors at Runnymede, National Trust
 The Jurors artwork at Runnymede, Exploring Surrey's Past
 The Jurors, an artwork by Hew Locke for Runnymede - Lillie Lenton, Exploring Surrey's Past
 The Jurors, an artwork by Hew Locke for Runnymede - Clause 39 of Magna Carta, Exploring Surrey's Past 
 The Jurors, an artwork by Hew Locke for Runnymede - freedom of speech, Exploring Surrey's Past 
 Hew Locke, Exploring Surrey's Past 
 The Jurors, hewlocke.net
 Magna Carta: Prince William unveils Hew Locke's new artwork The Jurors at Runnymede, SurreyLive, 16 June 2015
 The Jurors and the Queen: Memorialising Magna Carta at Runnymede, Steven Franklin, 18 October 2017
 Hew Locke, The Jurors, situations.org.uk

2015 sculptures
Buildings and structures in Surrey